Franklin Lake is a valley playa fed by the Franklin River in Elko County, Nevada, US. While mostly under private ownership, parts are owned by  The Nature Conservancy and Bureau of Land Management; the Franklin Lake Wildlife Management Area is owned by the Nevada Department of Wildlife. The area's habitat,  in size, consists of wetlands, an ephemeral lake, marshes, riparian woodland, alkali playa, shrub steppe, and grassland.

Flora and fauna

Scirpus validus grows abundantly. When the area is wet, hundreds of thousands of waterfowl visit Franklin Lake.   Avifauna include the American Avocet, Greater Sandhill Crane, Forster's Ter, Caspian Tern, Black Tern,  Greater Sage-Grouse, Franklin's Gulls, American White Pelican, Brewer's Sparrow and Sage Sparrow. It was named in honor of President Franklin Pierce by Lieutenant E. G. Beckwith of the 1854 Beckwith Expedition.

References

Lakes of Nevada
Lakes of Elko County, Nevada
Endorheic lakes of Nevada